La Liga TV is an English pay television channel that broadcasts live La Liga football games and content in the United Kingdom and Ireland. It is the United Kingdom’s first channel dedicated to showing content from an overseas football league. As well as being a television channel, La Liga TV operates as an online streaming service.

The channel is part of La Liga president Javier Tebas' aim to move the league from an organiser of games to a global content provider. La Liga is the world's first football league to run its own television channel.

History 
La Liga TV was launched on 13 January 2020 through Premier Sports on Sky UK's television platform. Lasting for three seasons, the deal made Premier Sports the league's exclusive broadcast partner in the UK and Ireland. Sky customers were given free access to the channel for its first two weeks. It was launched through Sky in the Republic of Ireland on 29 January 2020.

Pundits and analysts featured on the channel include Sid Lowe, Graham Hunter, Terry Gibson, Gaizka Mendieta, Albert Ferrer, Nayim, Gus Poyet, Andrea Orlandi, Toni Padilla, Steve Archibald, Lauren, Guillem Balagué, Duncan McMath, Manu Vieyra and Victor Sanchez del Amo.

When La Liga returned in June 2020, after a break enforced by the COVID-19 pandemic, Sky customers were again given free access to the channel.

Notes 

La Liga
Television channels and stations established in 2020
Sports television channels in the United Kingdom
2020 establishments in the United Kingdom
Sports television in Spain
Association football on television